Bradley R. Crowell is an American policy advisor and government official who served as director of the Nevada Department of Conservation and Natural Resources. He was confirmed as a member of the Nuclear Regulatory Commission on August 2, 2022 and was sworn in on August 26, 2022.

Early life and education 
Crowell is a native of Carson City, Nevada. His father, Bob Crowell, served as mayor of Carson City. He earned a Bachelor of Science degree in political science and government from Santa Clara University.

Career 
From 1999 to 2001, Crowell served as a legislative assistant for Senator Richard Bryan. From 2004 to 2007, he was a legislative advocate for the Natural Resources Defense Council. From 2007 to 2010, he served as a senior advisor for Senator Sheldon Whitehouse. Crowell then joined the United States Department of Energy, serving as assistant secretary for the Office of Congressional and Intergovernmental Affairs from 2010 to 2016. In December 2016, Crowell was appointed to serve as director of the Nevada Department of Conservation and Natural Resources by Governor Brian Sandoval.

References 

Living people
People from Carson City, Nevada
United States Department of Energy officials
Obama administration personnel
Biden administration personnel
Year of birth missing (living people)
Santa Clara University alumni